Dogolion textrix is a species of moth of the family Tortricidae. It is endemic to Ecuador (Morona-Santiago Province).

The ground colour of the forewings is cream, and is sprinkled with grey and darker strigulae and lines. The markings are grey. The hindwings are cream, with the distal part suffused and strigulated with grey.

Etymology
The species name refers to elaborate lineation of the forewings and is derived from Latin textor (meaning weaver).

References

External links

Moths described in 2006
Endemic fauna of Ecuador
Euliini
Moths of South America
Taxa named by Józef Razowski